Norla Road railway station is a railway station on the East Coast Railway network in the state of Odisha, India. It serves Norla town. Its code is NRLR. It has two platforms. Passenger, Express trains halt at Norla Road railway station.

Major trains

 Korba–Visakhapatnam Express
 Puri–Ahmedabad Express
 Samata Express
 Bilaspur–Tirupati Express
 Dhanbad–Alappuzha Express
 Sambalpur–Rayagada Intercity Express
 Samaleshwari Express

See also
 Kalahandi district

References

Railway stations in Kalhandi district
Sambalpur railway division